Roque Ponce (late 17th century) was a Spanish painter of landscapes, active in Madrid, where he  trained with Juan de la Corte. He flourished about the year 1690. In some of his pictures, the figures are by Antonio Castrejon.

References

Artists from Madrid
Spanish landscape painters
Spanish Baroque painters
17th-century Spanish painters
Spanish male painters